Štichov is a municipality and village in Plzeň-South District in the Plzeň Region of the Czech Republic. It has about 80 inhabitants.

History
The first written mention of Štichov is from 1379.

From 1 January 2021, Štichov is no longer a part of Domažlice District and belongs to Plzeň-South District.

References

Villages in Plzeň-South District